Chungjeongno-dong is a dong, neighbourhood of Seodaemun-gu in Seoul, South Korea.

Chung Jeung No
Chung Jeung No is a Road that is located in Seoul, Seodaemun-gu chungjeungno 2 ga 8-2 through chungjeungno 3 ga 44

The Road is 40 meters wide and 0.9 km long. It is an 8 lined arterial highway, which connects gwanghwamun, sinchon, and mapo-gu.

Chungjeongno used to be called Jookchumjeong, named by Japanese during the Japanese colonial era but renamed to its current title in October 1 of 1984, by South Korean Government named after the joseon's loyalist Min Yonghwan's posthumous name

Chungjeongno used to be 1.5 km long, but it was shorten about 700 m in November 7 of 1984 to current length. noticeable passing cities are seodaemun-gu, chungjeongno-dong, Bugahyeon-dong, Migeun-dong, Migeun-dong, and mapo-gu ahyeon-dong

Subway
Chungjeongno-dong has two very convenient subway stations called Chungjeongno Station, which are Seoul Subway Line 2 and Seoul Subway Line 2.
These two subway lines allow people to travel everywhere in city of Seoul within an hour.

Notable Places
 Mi-dong Elementary school - Mi-Dong is one of the earliest elementary school established in South Korea. The school was established in 1895, started as a primary school and changed its format to Elementary school and had its first graduation in 1906
 Korean Salvation Army Building - cost of construction was estimated to 50 Million. Many criticisms are being targeted to its organization and the fundings of the construction.

See also 
 Administrative divisions of South Korea

References

External links 
 Seodaemun-gu Official site in English
 Map of Seodaemun-gu
  Seodaemun-gu Official website

Neighbourhoods of Seodaemun District